Tabernaemontana sphaerocarpa is a species of plant in the family Apocynaceae. It is found in Java to Maluku.

References

sphaerocarpa